Electronic road pricing  (ERP) is an electronic toll collection scheme first proposed in Hong Kong as early as in the 1980s to manage traffic by congestion pricing. (Singapore, which first adopted ERP in 1998, was the first city in the world to implement electronic congestion pricing.)

Hong Kong first conducted a pilot test on the electronic road pricing system between 1983 and 1985 with positive results, but when it tried to implement an actual electronic road pricing, it failed because of public opposition.  The study also included a simulation of the Singapore Area Licensing Scheme, a 12-hour toll collecting system enforced manually implemented in 1975, and itself also a world pioneering effort as the first practical implementation of congestion pricing ever. However, public opposition against Hong Kong ERP stalled its permanent implementation.

Current developments
New  studies conducted in the 1990s and the opposition towards further reclamation of the Victoria Harbour recently has led to advocates of the ERP as a possible alternative for road management. Thomas Chow, Deputy Secretary for the Environment, Transport and Works, noted, however, that the Central-Wan Chai Bypass, to be built on the reclaimed land, is still needed because the ERP works best if an alternative road system is available, citing the Singapore and London experiences whereby the systems were only implemented after bypasses and alternative routes were available.

See also
Road pricing
Congestion pricing
Milan Area C
Electronic toll collection
Electronic Road Pricing (Singapore)
London Congestion Charge
Singapore Area Licensing Scheme
Stockholm congestion tax

References

External links
Feasibility Study on Electronic Road Pricing, April 2001 – Hong Kong Government
Finance Committee (Papers) 7 Jun 96 – Finance Committee, Legislative Council
Panel on Transport (Papers) 13 Mar 98 – Panel on Transport, Legislative Council
Transport Management, Hong Kong Annual Report 1999
  "Electronic Road Pricing: Developments in Hong Kong 1983–89" in Journal of Transport Economics and Policy, 24 (2), May 1990, pp. 203–214 (Adobe Acrobat PDF format)
Electronic Road Pricing Hong Kong – Wilbur Smith Associates
"Transport for Urban Development in Hong Kong" Timothy D. Hau, The University of Hong Kong, Hong Kong
The Hong Kong ERP Trial 
  Innovative techniques for electronic road pricing
Evaluation of Electronic Road Pricing (ERP) Technology for Hong Kong – The Hong Kong Polytechnic University, Hong Kong
Clean the Air – Hong Kong
Sustainable Transport in Hong Kong – The Dynamics of the Transport Related Decision-Making Process – Jarrad Brownlee, Civic Exchange, July 2001

Hong Kong
Road transport in Hong Kong